Star Gala is a compilation album by Spanish duo Baccara released by BMG-Ariola's mid-price label Spectrum in 1994.

This compilation includes recordings by the original formation of the duo, Mayte Mateos and María Mendiola, taken from their RCA-Victor studio albums Baccara (1977), Light My Fire (1978), Colours (1979) and the greatest hits collection The Hits Of Baccara (1978).

Track listing

 "Yes Sir, I Can Boogie"  (Dostal - Soja)  - 4:33
 "Sorry, I'm a Lady"  (Dostal - Soja)  - 3:39
 "Darling"  (7" version) (Dostal - Soja)  - 5:28
 "Parlez-vous français?"  (English version) (Soja - Dostal - Zentner)  - 4:25
 "The Devil Sent You to Lorado"  (Dostal - Soja)  - 4:07
 "Body Talk" (Dostal - Soja) - 4:38
 "Ay Ay Sailor" (Dostal - Soja) - 3:50
 "Granada"  (Lara)  - 4:21
 "Gimme More"  (Soja - Zentner) - 3:50
 "You and Me" (English version of "Amoureux")  (Soja - Dostal)  - 3:25
 "La Bamba"  (Traditional)  - 3:04
 "For You" (Dostal - Soja) - 3:45
 "I'll Learn to Fly Tonight"  (Soja - Zentner) - 3:29
 "Baby, Why Don't You Reach Out?" / "Light My Fire"  (Edited version) (Soja - Dostal) / (Densmore - Krieger -  Manzarek - Morrison)  - 4:46

Personnel
 Mayte Mateos - vocals
 María Mendiola - vocals

Production
 Produced and arranged by Rolf Soja.

Track annotations
 Tracks 1, 2, 8  & 9 from 1977 studio album Baccara.
 Track 3 from 1978 7" single "Darling". Full-length version appears on album Light My Fire.
 Tracks 4 & 10 from 1978 7" single "Parlez-Vous Français? (English version)". The original French version of "Parlez-Vous Français?" appears on album Light My Fire.
 Track 5 from 1978 compilation The Hits Of Baccara.
 Tracks 6, 7, 12 & 13 from 1979 studio album Colours.
 Track 11 from 1978 studio album Light My Fire.
 Track 14 edited version taken from 1978 compilation The Hits Of Baccara. Full-length version appears on album Light My Fire.

Sources and external links
 Allmusic, Baccara discography.
 Baccara discography.
 Baccara discography

Baccara albums
1994 compilation albums
Bertelsmann Music Group compilation albums